The Communist Party of Greece (Marxist–Leninist) (Kommounistiko Komma Elladas (marxistiko-leninistiko), KKE (m-l)), is a Maoist communist political party in Greece.

History
KKE (m-l) was founded in November 1976 by the majority of the Organisation of Marxists-Leninists of Greece (OMLE), itself a splinter group of the Communist Party of Greece since 1964. The minority became the Marxist-Leninist Communist Party of Greece (M-L KKE). Despite further subsequent splits and the creation of smaller groupings, the two parties, KKE (m-l) and M-L KKE, have remained the major representatives of Maoism in Greece to this day. The student wing of KKE (m-l) was the Progressive All-Student Unionist Camp (PPSP), which was "less popular [than the mainstream organisations], but still important" at Greek universities at the time.

In October 1977, on the eve of the first death anniversary of Mao Zedong, KKE(m-l) co-signed a declaration with the Communist Party of Germany/Marxists–Leninists, Communist Party of Spain (Marxist–Leninist), Communist Party of Italy (Marxist–Leninist) and the Portuguese Communist Party (Reconstructed). The declaration, which was published on the front page of the Albanian daily Zëri i Popullit, rejected the Three Worlds Theory.

KKE (m-l) experienced a crisis in 1982 when the majority of its members left the party. This crisis was caused as a result of both international (death of Mao Zedong, the restoration of capitalism in China, etc.) and national events (government of PASOK, etc.). So the members that fighter that crisis created the new KKE (m-l)

On 16 March 2012, spurred by the ongoing Greek financial crisis, M-L KKE and KKE (m-l) announced that they would jointly contest elections as part of the Popular Resistance - Left Anti-Imperialist Cooperation (Λαϊκή Αντίσταση - Αριστερή Αντιμπεριαλιστική Συνεργασία), distancing themselves both from the traditional Communist Party of Greece (KKE) and the leftist Syriza coalition. KKE(m-l) and MLKKE contested the May 2012 legislative election under the slogan "Down with the Memorandum of Enslavement- The People don't owe anyone anything" and fielded 186 candidates across the country.

Historically, KKE (m-l) has been most active and has supporters in Ioannina, Thessaloniki and northern Greece in general, in Crete, and the Aegean islands of Lesbos and Samos.

Election results

Newspaper

KKE (m-l) publishes the biweekly newspaper, Proletariaki Simaia (Προλεταριακή Σημαία, "Proletarian Flag"), founded in early 1967 as one of the newspapers of OMLE.

See also
 Marxist-Leninist Communist Party of Greece

References

External links

1976 establishments in Greece
Communist parties in Greece
Far-left politics in Greece
Maoist organizations in Greece
Maoist parties
Political parties established in 1976